= Palmtown, Virginia =

Unincorporated community in Virginia, US

Coordinates: 38°05′36″N 76°39′19″W

Palmtown is an unincorporated community in Westmoreland County, in the U. S. state of Virginia.
